Muhammad Khan (born 4 September 1943) is an Indian equestrian. He competed in two events at the 1980 Summer Olympics.

References

1943 births
Living people
Indian male equestrians
Olympic equestrians of India
Equestrians at the 1980 Summer Olympics
Place of birth missing (living people)